Paul MacDermid (born April 14, 1963) is a Canadian former professional ice hockey right winger who played 690 games in the National Hockey League (NHL) for the Hartford Whalers, Winnipeg Jets, Washington Capitals, and Quebec Nordiques.  MacDermid was selected 61st overall in the 1981 NHL Entry Draft by Hartford. He played his junior career with the Windsor Spitfires of the Ontario Hockey League.

His oldest son, Lane was selected by the Boston Bruins in the 2009 NHL Entry Draft. Lane scored his first career NHL goal exactly 31 years after the same was done by Paul. They are only the second pair of father and son who scored their first goals on one date. His younger son, Kurtis is a defenseman for the Colorado Avalanche.

Career statistics

Regular season and playoffs

References

External links
 

1963 births
Living people
Canadian ice hockey right wingers
Hartford Whalers draft picks
Hartford Whalers players
People from Bruce County
Quebec Nordiques players
Washington Capitals players
Windsor Spitfires players
Winnipeg Jets (1979–1996) players